Petersburg (also, Petersburgh and Greenhorn) is a former settlement in Kern County, California. Petersburg still appeared on maps as of 1956.

A post office operated at Petersburgh from 1858 to 1863. The place was named for Peter Gardett, early merchant there.

References

Former settlements in Kern County, California
Former populated places in California